Campbelltown or Campbeltown can refer to:

Places
In Scotland
 Campbeltown, Kintyre, Argyll
 Campbelltown of Ardersier, near Inverness, often now just referred to as Ardersier to avoid confusion.

In Australia
Towns/suburbs:
Campbelltown, New South Wales
Campbelltown Hospital
Campbelltown Stadium, a sports ground used most often for Rugby League matches
Campbelltown, South Australia
Campbell Town, Tasmania
Government areas:
Electoral district of Campbelltown, state electoral district in New South Wales
City of Campbelltown (New South Wales), local government area in New South Wales
City of Campbelltown, South Australia, local government area in South Australia
Electoral district of Campbell Town, former state electoral district in Tasmania

In Guyana
 Campbelltown, Guyana

In New Zealand
Campbelltown, the former name of the town Bluff

In the United States
 Campbelltown, Indiana
 Campbell Town, NY, a redirect to Campbell, NY
 Campbelltown, Pennsylvania

See also
 Campbeltown (disambiguation)
 Campbellton (disambiguation)
 Campbell (disambiguation)